Octavius Goldney Radcliffe, born at North Newnton, Wiltshire on 20 October 1859 and died on 13 April 1940, played first-class cricket for Somerset and Gloucestershire.

References

1859 births
1940 deaths
English cricketers
Somerset cricketers
Gloucestershire cricketers
North v South cricketers
Gentlemen cricketers
Gentlemen of the South cricketers
Wiltshire cricketers
Gentlemen of England cricketers
C. I. Thornton's XI cricketers